Zvezdan also spelled Zvjezdan is a Slavic masculine given name. Notable people with the name include:

Zvezdan Čebinac (born 1939), former Serbian former football midfielder and manager
Zvezdan Jovanović (born 1965), the assassin of former Serbian Prime Minister Zoran Đinđić in 2003
Zvezdan Martič, Slovenian journalist and engineer
Zvezdan Pejović (born 1966), retired Yugoslav professional football defender
Zvezdan Terzić (born 1966), Serbian retired football player of Montenegrin origin

There is also:
Zvezdan (Zaječar), village in eastern Serbia

Slavic masculine given names
Serbian masculine given names